This is a list of characters in Isaac Asimov's Foundation series.
Through the centuries-spanning nature of the Foundation series, the lives of its various characters are limited to one or two of its nine episodes. In spite of the great success of the series, its characters have been described as "undifferentiated and one-dimensional" speaking with an "impoverished vocabulary". Their consciousness "shows absolutely no historical development and hence fails to evoke in the reader any feeling for the future universe they inhabit". Characterization in general is subordinated to the overall conception of Asimov's project.

Through the eyes of the characters the inevitability of the forces of history, made manifest in the Seldon Plan, is demonstrated to the reader repeatedly. Charles Elkins sees the characters in Foundation not as "tragic heroes. They are nondescript pawns, unable to take their destiny into their own hands." Only those elite few characters who understand the Plan can be considered free, with the Mule through his non-human psychic powers as the only exception. But while Elkins attributes the Foundation series a sense of "pervading fatalism", Nicolas David Gevers and James Gunn point out that the obstacles presented in Asimov's galactic history are overcome by active individual characters "through the initiative and competence which the Foundations nurture in their citizens". Donald E. Palumbo asserts that it is exactly the "flatness of character and setting" which permit the series "to be a masterpiece". The heroism and depth of individual characters is consciously taken back by Asimov for the true hero of the series to stand out: "the sublime history of humankind itself".

Arkady Darell
Future novelist Arcadia "Arkady" Darell is the "concluding key figure" of the original Foundation trilogy.

Ammel Brodrig
Ammel Brodrig is an influential courtier and Privy Secretary at the court of Cleon II.   He is depicted as a particularly corrupt character, lacking even the elementary honesty of honourable corruption. Nicolas David Gevers saw Brodrig as based on Narses, an important member of the court of Byzantine emperor Justinian I, "who dogged Belisarius" - the model for Bel Riose - "and ultimately replaced him as general".

Bel Riose
Bel Riose was the last strong General of the Galactic Empire, Commander of the legendary Twentieth Fleet, who eventually came to be known as "the Last of the Imperials."

Asimov loosely based Bel Riose on Flavius Belisarius, a great general of the Roman Empire during the 6th century AD. Like Riose, Belisarius served a strong emperor, Justinian the Great, in an empire that had declined from its peak (Belisarius was one of the people, along with Justinian, known as "the last of the Romans", i.e., imperials); helped it to recapture much of its lost territory, including Rome itself; and was called back on baseless suspicion that he was angling for the Imperial throne. Unlike Riose, Belisarius was not executed but retired (and, according to unsubstantiated legend, was blinded and cast out of Constantinople as a beggar).

James Gunn saw Riose as "the only character who stares in the face of determinism". While his failure against the forces of historic necessity might seem depressing, the fact that he is not the viewpoint character changes the impact of the story: the reader sympathizes with the Foundation. Riose's failure is depicted as desirable, as it ensures the Foundation's survival.

Cleon II
Cleon II is the last strong monarch of the Galactic Empire. As the Galactic Empire is based on the Roman Empire, and Bel Riose is based on Belisarius, Cleon II is clearly based on the Eastern Roman Emperor Justinian I. His name however derives from Cleon, an Athenian politician of the Peloponnesian War (just as Eastern Roman emperors soon after Justinian used Greek names). In the 2021 TV adaptation, all Emperor Cleons are genetic clones of Emperor Cleon I, but this is not in Asimov's books, which do not include cloning.

Dagobert IX
Emperor Dagobert IX is one of the last emperors of the Galactic Empire.

The reason why Asimov gave this character the name Dagobert is not too clear, but it is likely a reference to Frankish kings of the Merovingian dynasty.

Nicolas David Gevers pointed out the parallels between the character of Dagobert and the destitute last Western Roman emperor Romulus Augustulus. In this reading, the rebel Gilmer, the character responsible for the sack of Trantor, is equated with Alaric, king of the Visigoths.

Dors Venabili
Dors Venabili is a robot, the primary character of Prelude to Foundation and Forward the Foundation, and a good friend, protector, and later wife of Hari Seldon.

At face value, Venabili is a woman two years younger than Seldon, in her own words "not very good-looking". She tells Seldon that she is a historian from Cinna, and, before her involvement in The Flight, Venabili taught history classes at Streeling University on Trantor.

Hari Seldon

Hari Seldon is the founder of the two Foundations. He is a psychohistorian who, through the calculations of psychohistory, predicts the downfall of 'The Empire' and a potential 30,000-year interregnum. He sets up the First and Second Foundations to reduce this huge gap from 30,000 years down to 1000 years. Following a trial, Hari Seldon and his 100,000 followers are exiled to the planet Terminus where the First Foundation is set up. Unknown to many, a Second Foundation is set up at a separate location. Clues to its existence come from a statement by Hari Seldon of it being at 'Star's End'. Many searches are made for this and several of the characters have their own theories about where this is.

Homir Munn
Homir Munn is a librarian and owns one of the biggest collections of information about the Mule.

Munn is one of five conspirators central to the plot of Second Foundation, who plan to find the location of the Second Foundation.

Homir Munn "is a stutterer described as "lanky," "ill-at-ease," and "introverted." Marcia J. Myers found that this "stereotype behavior gives this librarian's image an overall rather negative rating".

The Mule
The Mule is a central character in Foundation and Empire (1952) and Second Foundation (1953).

The Mule's name is a reference to the sterility of mules, since he is also genetically sterile. Without a child, the Mule's empire ends soon after his death.

According to his autobiography In Memory Yet Green (1979), Asimov modeled the Mule's physical appearance on Leonard Meisel, a friend at the World War II-era Navy Yard in Philadelphia. In keeping with the Foundation series being based on the Roman Empire, the Mule has historical parallels with Attila the Hun, Tamerlane, and Charlemagne; he has also been compared to the Roman Emperor Augustus, Napoleon, Adolf Hitler, Stalin, and several other tyrants and demagogues of recent history.

References

 
Foundation